
Jindong may refer to:

China
Jindong District, Jinhua, Zhejiang
Jindong, Maoming, in Xinyi, Guangdong
Jindong Subdistrict, Jinping District, Shantou, Guangdong
Jindong Township, Chongqing
Jindong Township, Gansu, in Liangdang County, Gansu
Jindong Township, Sichuan, in Guangyuan, Sichuan

South Korea
Jindong-myeon, Paju, Gyeonggi
Jindong-myeon, Changwon, South Gyeongsang
Jindong Formation, geological formation in South Gyeongsang

Others
Jindong, Western Australia, near Busselton
Jindong Movie Theater, Jinsha Township, Kinmen County, Taiwan

See also
Jin Dong, Chinese actor